The Timarion is a Byzantine pseudo-Lucianic satirical dialogue probably composed in the twelfth century (there are references to the eleventh-century Michael Psellus), though possibly later.

The eponymous hero, on his way to a Christian fair at Thessalonica, is unexpectedly taken to Hades, which is ruled by pagan figures and pagan justice (including the emperor Theophilos as a judge), and where "Galilæans" (that is, Christians) make up only one sect (αἵρεσις) of many.

In one scene, a eunuch whose face "shines like the sun" whispers in Timarion's ear. His companion Theodore says it's his guardian angel.

Edition and translation
 R. Romano, "Pseudo-Luciano, Timarione", in Byzantina et neo-hellenica neapolitana 2. Naples: Università di Napoli. Cattedra di filologia bizantina, 1974; pp. 49-92.
 B. Baldwin, Timarion, Translated with Introduction and Commentary. Detroit: Wayne State University Press, 1984.
 Anonim Bir Bizans Hicvi Timarion, çev: Engin ÖZTÜRK, İstanbul: Urzeni Yayınları, 2020.

See also
 The Menippus or Necyomantia by Lucian
 Mazaris' Journey to Hades (late Byzantine)

References
 Kaldellis, A., Hellenism in Byzantium: The Transformations of Greek Identity and the Reception of the Classical Tradition. Cambridge: CUP, 2008; pp. 276-283.
 Ejusdem, "The Timarion: Toward a Literary Interpretation", in P. Odorico (ed.), La face cachée de la littérature Byzantine: Le texte en tant que message immédiat. Paris: École des hautes études en sciences sociales, Centre d’études Byzantines, néo-helléniques et sud-est européennes (Dossiers byzantins, vol. 7, forthcoming).
 Kazhdan, A. and A. Wharton-Epstein, Change in Byzantine Culture in the Eleventh and Twelfth Centuries. Berkeley and Los Angeles: University of California Press, 1990; pp. 139sq.

Byzantine literature
12th-century books